Tetrodontium repandum, the small four-tooth moss, is a moss in the family Tetraphidaceae. It is one of only two recognized species in the genus Tetrodontium, and is native to subalpine regions of the Northern Hemisphere. It has been reported from Alaska, British Columbia, Washington state, Japan, and Europe.

See also
 List of extinct plants of the British Isles

References

Tetraphidopsida
Flora of Alaska
Flora of British Columbia
Flora of Japan
Flora without expected TNC conservation status